Frans Thomas Koppelaar (born April 23, 1943), is a Dutch painter, who was born in The Hague, Netherlands.

From 1963 to 1969, he attended the Royal Academy of Visual Arts at The Hague. He moved to Amsterdam in 1968.

His landscapes and Amsterdam cityscapes are painted in a style that recalls the classical tradition of the Hague School and the Amsterdam Impressionists.

Koppelaar's work is congenial to a figurative movement in Dutch contemporary painting that evolved during the 1990s in a reaction to the pared-down conceptual art and the too pompous art-theories of that period. Through the years his style evolved into a simpler, straightforward approach. By 1984, he no longer identified himself with any art movement.

Koppelaar is also known as a portraitist.

Bibliography
Brunt, Ineke & Eisema, Joan (2004), "Gegrepen door het moment - Amsterdam in olieverf" ("Grasped by the moment - Amsterdam in oils"), Stichting de Heeren Keyser 
"Amsterdam Urban Landscapes from the Meentwijck Collection" (2003), Auction House Christie's, Amsterdam
Denninger, Carole (2008), "Amsterdam 365 Stadsgezichten", THOTH, Bussum NL

References

External links

1943 births
Living people
Dutch painters
Dutch male painters
Dutch landscape painters
Dutch portrait painters
Royal Academy of Art, The Hague alumni
Cityscape artists
Artists from The Hague